Ole-Christoffer Granmo (born 26 August 1974) is a Norwegian computer scientist. Granmo is a professor and director at the Centre for Artificial Intelligence Research  (CAIR) at the University of Agder.

Granmo grew up in Skien and studied at the University of Oslo. He completed his master's degree in computer science in 1999 and PhD in 2004.

In 2018, Granmo published a paper on an artificial Intelligence algorithm based on propositional logic, which he named a Tsetlin machine. Researchers around the world has since started to adopt the technology, and seen promising results for the technology in a variety of fields. In 2022, Granmo was named the decade's researcher in artificial intelligence by Norwegian Artificial Intelligence Research Consortium (NORA).

References

External links 

 Ole-Christoffer Granmo publications indexed by Google Scholar.
 Profile page for the University of Agder.

Norwegian computer scientists
1974 births
Living people
Academic staff of the University of Agder
People from Skien
University of Oslo alumni